Alfred Bourne may refer to:

 Alfred Bourne (cricketer) (1848–1931), English cricketer
 Alfred Bourne (footballer) (1894–1939), English footballer
 Alfred Gibbs Bourne (1859–1940), British zoologist, botanist and educator